Count Basie/Sarah Vaughan is a 1961 album by the American jazz singer Sarah Vaughan, accompanied by the Count Basie Orchestra, with arrangements by Frank Foster, Thad Jones and Ernie Wilkins. According to James Gavin's liner notes to the 1996 CD release, Basie himself does not perform on any of the tracks.

The original LP was part of Roulette Records' Birdland Series, "which takes its name from the world-renowned jazz nightclub," according to the back cover notes.

Track listing 
 "Perdido" (Ervin Drake, Hans J. Lengsfelder, Juan Tizol) – 2:12
 "Lover Man (Oh Where Can You Be?)" (Jimmy Davis, Ram Ramirez, James Sherman) – 3:59
 "I Cried for You" (Gus Arnheim, Arthur Freed, Abe Lyman) – 2:56
 "Alone" (Nacio Herb Brown, Freed) – 3:56
 "There Are Such Things" (George W. Meyer, Stanley Adams, Abel Baer) – 3:12
 "Mean to Me" (Fred E. Ahlert, Roy Turk) – 2:51
 "The Gentleman Is a Dope" (Oscar Hammerstein II, Richard Rodgers) – 2:46
 "You Go to My Head" (J. Fred Coots, Haven Gillespie) – 4:53
 "Until I Met You" (Freddie Green, Don Wolf) – 3:10
 "You Turned the Tables on Me" (Louis Alter, Sidney Mitchell) – 3:24
 "Little Man (You've Had a Busy Day)" 	(Mabel Wayne, Al Hoffman, Maurice Sigler) – 4:53
 1996 CD reissue bonus tracks not included on the original 1961 release:
 "Teach Me Tonight" (Sammy Cahn, Gene de Paul, arr. Ernie Wilkins) (with Joe Williams) - 2:53
 "If I Were a Bell" (Frank Loesser) (with Joe Williams) – 2:45
 "Until I Met You" – 2:48

All tracks arranged by Thad Jones, except "Little Man (You've Had a Busy Day)" by Frank Foster and "Teach Me Tonight" by Ernie Wilkins.

Personnel 
 Sarah Vaughan - vocal

The Count Basie Orchestra

 Sonny Cohn - trumpet
 Joe Newman - trumpet, solo on Mean to Me
 Snooky Young - trumpet
 Thad Jones - trumpet, arranger
 Henry Coker - trombone
 Al Grey - trombone
 Benny Powell - trombone
 Marshal Royal - clarinet, alto saxophone
 Frank Wess - flute, alto saxophone, tenor saxophone
 Frank Foster - arranger, tenor saxophone
 Billy Mitchell - tenor saxophone, solo on I Cried for You
 Charlie Fowlkes - baritone saxophone
 Freddie Green - guitar
 Eddie Jones - double bass
 Sonny Payne - drums
 Kirk Stuart - piano
 Joe Williams - vocal (12, 13)
 Ernie Wilkins - arranger
 Thad Jones
 Teddy Reig - producer

References

1961 albums
Sarah Vaughan albums
Count Basie Orchestra albums
Roulette Records albums
Albums produced by Teddy Reig
Albums arranged by Frank Foster (musician)
Albums arranged by Thad Jones
Albums arranged by Ernie Wilkins
Joe Williams (jazz singer) albums